John H. Crawford (born February 2, 1953) is an American computer engineer.

Career
During a long career at Intel starting in 1977, he was the chief architect of the Intel 80386 and Intel 80486 microprocessors.  He also co-managed the design of the Intel P5 Pentium microprocessor family. Crawford was the recipient of the 1995 Eckert–Mauchly Award. He was awarded the IEEE Ernst Weber Engineering Leadership Recognition in 1997.

Crawford was elected a member of the National Academy of Engineering in 2002 for the architectural design of widely used microprocessors.

He retired from Intel in 2013.

In 2014, he was made a fellow of the Computer History Museum for his work on industry-standard microprocessor architectures.

Bibliography

References

External links
 Oral History of John H. Crawford 2014 Computer History Museum Fellow

Computer designers
21st-century American engineers
Intel people
Living people
Members of the United States National Academy of Engineering
1953 births
American electrical engineers